Lucas Justra Bjerregaard (born 14 August 1991) is a Danish professional golfer who plays the European Tour. In May 2017, playing with Thorbjørn Olesen, they won the inaugural GolfSixes, an unofficial pairs event on the European Tour. Later that year, in September, he had his first solo win on the European Tour, the Portugal Masters. In October 2018, Bjerregaard won the Alfred Dunhill Links Championship for his second European Tour victory.

Amateur career
Bjerregaard played on the Continental Europe team in the 2009 Jacques Léglise Trophy. He played in the Eisenhower Trophy for Denmark in 2008 and 2010; the 2010 team, with Joachim B. Hansen and Morten Ørum Madsen finished second to France by one stroke. Bjerregaard won the Danish Open Amateur in 2007 and 2008, and the European Amateur in 2010. Bjerregaard committed to play golf at Florida State University, but turned pro before entering college.

Professional career
Bjerregaard turned professional in 2011 and in 2012, he won the Order of Merit (leading money winner) on the Nordic Golf League. He won three Nordic Golf League between 2011 and 2013.

Bjerregaard played on the Challenge Tour in 2013, making 14 cuts in 18 events. His best finish was second place at the National Bank of Oman Golf Classic. He finished 34th in the Challenge Tour rankings. He then competed in the European Tour Qualifying School and finished T-17 to earn his European Tour card for 2014.

On the European Tour in 2014, he made 17 cuts in 26 events, including three top-10 finishes. He finished 90th in the Race to Dubai rankings and retained his card for 2015. At the 2014 U.S. Open he finished in a tie for 40th place.

Bjerregaard earned his first European Tour win at the 2017 Portugal Masters.

On 7 October 2018, Bjerregaard won the Alfred Dunhill Links Championship at the Old Course at St Andrews beating Tommy Fleetwood and Tyrrell Hatton by one stroke and winning €695,759 for his second European Tour victory.

At the 2019 WGC-Dell Technologies Match Play, having defeated 2016 Open champion Henrik Stenson earlier in the day, Bjerregaard scored a massive upset victory over Tiger Woods 1 up. The following day, losses to Matt Kuchar and Francesco Molinari placed Bjerregaard 4th, his best finish in a World Golf Championships event.

Amateur wins
2007 Danish Open Amateur
2008 Danish Open Amateur
2010 European Amateur, Toyota Junior World Cup

Professional wins (6)

European Tour wins (2)

European Tour playoff record (0–1)

Nordic Golf League wins (3)

Other wins (1)

Results in major championships

CUT = missed the half-way cut
"T" = tied for place

Results in The Players Championship

"T" indicates a tie for a place

Results in World Golf Championships

"T" = Tied

Team appearances
Amateur
European Boys' Team Championship (representing Denmark): 2006, 2007 (winners), 2008, 2009 (winners)
Jacques Léglise Trophy (representing Continental Europe): 2009 
Eisenhower Trophy (representing Denmark): 2008, 2010
European Amateur Team Championship (representing Denmark): 2010, 2011

See also
2013 European Tour Qualifying School graduates

References

External links

Danish male golfers
European Tour golfers
Sportspeople from the North Jutland Region
People from Frederikshavn
1991 births
Living people